Nandeesha is a 2012 Indian Kannada-language film directed by Om Saiprakash, starring
Komal Kumar, Parul Yadav and Malavika in lead roles. The film is a remake of the Malayalam film Thilakkam (2003).

Cast

 Komal Kumar as Nandeesha 
 Parul Yadav 
 Malavika as Kavya
 Beha Bachani
 Srinivasa Murthy as Nanjundaswamy 
 Ramesh Bhat as Hanumanthaiah

Music

Reception

Critical response 

The Times of India scored the film at 3 out of 5 stars and says "Komal has done an excellent job as Nandeesha, but disappoints as Vishwa. Malavika scores over Parul in acting. Srinivasamurthy and Ramesh Bhat have done justice to their roles. Music by Hamsalekha is okay. Selvam’s camera work passes muster" Bangalore Mirror wrote "The biggest disappointment in the film is Hamsalekha. Neither his music or lyrics has even a touch of his magic. Has Sandalwood passed by him? In one of the songs, Komal seems to be imitating Ravichandran. His combination with Parul does not recreate Pyarge Aagibittaite. Veterans Srinivas Murthy and Ramesh Bhat stand out with their performances". Srikanth Srinivasa of Rediff.comscored the film at 2.5 out of 5 stars and wrote "Srinivasa Murthy has acted well and so has Ramesh Bhat. The songs are forgettable and the one redeeming feature in the movie is the lush green locations and snowy mountains of Switzerland. Nandisha is a disappointingly mediocre film from an established director". News18 India wrote "'Nandeesha' fails to entertain the audience mainly because of a poor script and ordinary technical values". Shruti I L of DNA (newspaper) wrote "Nandeesha could have been the perfect grand finale but instead it turns out to be a dampener. This time even Komal fails to entertain!"  BS Srivani of Deccan Herald wrote "Veterans Srinivasamurthy and Ramesh Bhat shoulder the entire film. Manikant Ka­dri’s background score is impressive. Hamsalekha’s music and lyrics are in a zone of their own. Nandeesha disappoints".

References

2010s Kannada-language films
2012 films
Kannada remakes of Malayalam films
Films directed by Sai Prakash